Free Gate may refer to:

 Freegate, an internet software utility
 a song by Rainie Yang on the album My Other Self